Ginder is a surname. Notable people with the surname include:

Grant Ginder (born 1982/1983), American writer
Philip De Witt Ginder (1905–1968), United States Army general

See also
Gindre
Rinder